Wild Love is the fourth album by Bill Callahan (also known as Smog), released on March 27, 1995, on Drag City and re-released in Europe on Domino in 2001. Jim O'Rourke appeared as cellist on this album, his first collaboration with Smog. Drag City's producer Rian Murphy helped to develop a wider musical palette than its predecessor Julius Caesar.

Cat Power later covered "Bathysphere" on her 1996 album What Would the Community Think.

Track listing
 "Bathysphere" – 4:50
 "Wild Love" – 1:35
 "Sweet Smog Children" – 1:41
 "Bathroom Floor" – 1:55
 "The Emperor" – 1:11
 "Limited Capacity" – 1:18
 "It's Rough" – 4:45
 "Sleepy Joe" – 3:53
 "The Candle" – 2:26
 "Be Hit" – 2:23
 "Prince Alone in the Studio" – 7:15
 "Goldfish Bowl" – 2:00

Personnel
 Bill Callahan – vocals, guitar, keyboards
 Cynthia Dall – guitar on tracks 8 and 11; vocals on track 11
 Jason Dezember – drums on track 10
 Ron Burns – drums on tracks 8, 11 and 12
 Ian O'Hey – Chamberlin on tracks 9 and 11
 Jim O'Rourke – cello on tracks 2, 4, 11 and 12
 Rian Murphy – production
 Konrad Strauss – engineering

References

1995 albums
Bill Callahan (musician) albums
Drag City (record label) albums
Domino Recording Company albums